The Golden Sheaf Award for best Indigenous production is presented by the Yorkton Film Festival.

History
In 1947 the Yorkton Film Council was founded.  The first Yorkton Film Festival was held in 1950  During the first few festivals, the films were adjudicated by audience participation through ballot casting and winners were awarded Certificates of Merit by the film council.  In 1958 the film council established the Yorkton Film Festival Golden Sheaf Award for Best of Festival, awarded to the best overall film of the festival.  Over the years various additional categories were added to the competition.  As of 2020, the Golden Sheaf Award categories included: Main Entry Categories, Accompanying Categories, Craft Categories, and Special Awards.

The category was first introduced in 2004 under the Aboriginal name, and was renamed to Indigenous in 2018.

The winner of this award is determined by a panel of jurors, selected by the film council. The submission rules specify that productions can either be fiction or non-fiction and need to "explore issues related to indigenous peoples, tell indigenous stories or present indigenous perspectives..." among additional criteria.

Winners

2000s

2010s

2020s

References 

Awards established in 2004
Yorkton Film Festival awards